Limited Edition (LE) candy is specialized candy manufactured for a limited time period, typically eight to twelve weeks. Limited-edition as a candy marketing strategy was first used in 2003; by August 2005, more than 60 limited-edition candy varieties had been marketed.

Hershey's Dark Kisses (released as limited-edition in July 2003), Kit Kat White Chocolate, and Reese's White Chocolate were eventually made permanent due to customer demand.

LE candy are often used for cross-promotion with films.

Some believe that LE candy merely builds upon base brand sales; others believe in the long-run that they "cannibalize base brand sales."

Some vendors, notably Six Flags, are reluctant to carry LE candy, preferring "proven sellers."

References

External links
Limited Edition at Candy Blog

Brand name confectionery
Marketing strategy